Tshililo Michael Masutha  is a South African advocate and retired politician. He was born in Valdezia in 1965 in Northern Transvaal, what is now Limpopo province, in South Africa. He is the former Minister of Justice and Correctional Services. Before becoming MP in 1999, he served as a human rights lawyer. He served as the Deputy Minister of Science and Technology from 2013 to 2014. Born with a visual disability, he was the second minister with a disability to be appointed to Jacob Zuma's cabinet. He founded Northern Transvaal Association for the Blind in 1989.

References

Living people
1965 births
Justice ministers of South Africa
Members of the National Assembly of South Africa